The Cannes Soundtrack Award is an independent award of the Cannes Film Festival bestowed by the jury of the festival on one of the competing feature films.

Cannes Soundtrack Award

Best Synchronised Music

See also
Academy Award for Best Original Score

References

External links
 Cannes Film Festival at IMDb 

Lists of films by award 
Cannes Film Festival
Film awards for best score
Awards established in 2013